Edward A. Linley (26 September 1894 – after 1928) was an English professional footballer who made 142 appearances in the Football League playing as an outside left.

Linley was born in East Retford, Nottinghamshire. He played football for Kiveton Park and Midland League club Worksop Town before signing for Birmingham in December 1920 for a fee reported as £600. He helped them win the Football League Second Division title in the 1920–21 season and appeared in more than 100 top-flight matches for the club. He also played for Nottingham Forest, Sutton Town, Mansfield Town, and Shirebrook.

References

1894 births
Year of death missing
English footballers
Association football outside forwards
Kiveton Park F.C. players
Worksop Town F.C. players
Birmingham City F.C. players
Nottingham Forest F.C. players
Ashfield United F.C. players
Mansfield Town F.C. players
Shirebrook Miners Welfare F.C. players
Midland Football League players
English Football League players
Place of death missing
Sportspeople from Retford
Footballers from Nottinghamshire